Delfinul ('The dolphin') is a  of the Romanian Naval Forces. It was commissioned in August 1985 and is currently the only Romanian submarine in service. Due to a lack of funding the submarine has been inactive since 1995; it is kept in reserve docked in the military sector of the Port of Constanța.

History 

In the early 1980s, the Romanian Naval Forces expressed the need for a submarine to train the anti-submarine vessels of the fleet. The Chinese government made an offer for six Type 33 submarines, two built in China (one with Romanian workers) and four in Romania. However, the Type 33 was an obsolete design and the Romanian government decided to purchase Soviet equipment. A  was acquired in 1984 for $61.5 million from USSR. The submarine was built by Krasnoye Sormovo Factory No. 112 in Gorki. The Romanian crew of the submarine was trained in the USSR. The submarine, christened Delfinul, was delivered in 1985. Another two Kilo-class submarines were planned for purchase, but due to financial reasons, the orders were cancelled.

Service 

The submarine successfully accomplished 67 missions, with 2,000 hours of immersion. During these missions, Delfinul launched 23 torpedoes and 2 naval mines. In 1996, the submarine exhausted the resources of the initial batteries and is kept in reserve since then. After 2001, the submarine was transferred to the "Mircea cel Bătrân" Naval Academy, being used as a training ship. Numerous overhauling plans have been proposed since 1996, yet none were implemented.

See also 
 , a World War II-era namesake

Notes

References 

 ***, Almanahul Forțelor Navale 2007, Statul Major al Forțelor Navale, Editura CTEA, București, 2006, 

Submarines of the Romanian Naval Forces
Attack submarines
Romania–Soviet Union relations
Kilo-class submarines
1985 ships
Ships built in the Soviet Union